Sir Peter Ashley Kendall  (born 8 May 1960) is an English farmer and former National Farmers' Union (NFU) officeholder from East Bedfordshire.

Kendall was the President of the NFU from 2006 until 2014, and since then has served as the President of the World Farmers Organisation and is current Chairman of the Agriculture and Horticulture Development Board (AHDB). He was knighted in the 2015 New Year Honours.

References

1960 births
Knights Bachelor
21st-century British farmers
Living people